A constitutional referendum was held in Mauritania on June 25, 2006 and approved by nearly 97% of voters. Following the August 2005 ousting of long-time president Maaouya Ould Sid'Ahmed Taya, the new transitional military regime called the referendum on a new constitution, which limited presidents to two five-year terms; previously presidential terms were six years and there was no limit on re-election. The new constitution also established a maximum age limit of 75 for presidential candidates.

Results

References

Mauritania
Referendums in Mauritania
2006 in Mauritania
Constitutional referendums
June 2006 events in Africa